Pine Creek is a  long 2nd order tributary to Sandy Creek in Pittsylvania County, Virginia.

Course 
Pine Creek rises about 1 mile east of Dodson Corners, Virginia in Pittsylvania County and then flows north-northeast to join Sandy Creek about 1 mile northeast of Keeling.

Watershed 
Pine Creek drains  of area, receives about 45.6 in/year of precipitation, has a wetness index of 376.86, and is about 52% forested.

See also 
 List of Virginia Rivers

References 

Rivers of Pittsylvania County, Virginia
Rivers of Virginia